"Sambar" is a Malayalam movie released on 25 March 2016. The movie revolves around lives of six orphan boys, who grow up to become goons. They have led their lives doing petty thefts and crimes. One day they come across the biggest job they have ever been given, the remuneration of which is large. They decide to take up the risky job and decide to lead a normal life after getting the hefty sum. Directed by Navas Kallara, the movie was released under the banner "Three Brothers Creations" and produced by Vishnu Manohar.

Sound Tracks 
The movie contains six sound tracks composed by Sunny Viswanath. Lyrics has been penned by Harinarayanan BK & Thampu Delsy Ninan. Promo song video has been directed by Anoop Krishnan. Cinematography of promo song videos has been done by Amosh Puthiyattil (for The Sambar Song) & Sibi Manjale (for Poonkathirukal). Songs are released under the label "Paattukada Music".

1. The Sambar Song

Singers : Delsy Ninan, Sreekanth Sasikanth, Simran Sehgal, Sreerag Ram, Praveen R

Lyrics : Thampu Delsy Ninan

2. Oro Dhinam Oro Mukham

Singer : Chinmayi Sriprada

Lyrics : Harinarayanan BK

3. Poomkathirukal

Singers : P Jayachandran, Delsy Ninan

Lyrics : Thampu Delsy Ninan

4. Aakashappaalathil

Singers : Sreekanth Sasikanth, Sreerag Ram

Lyrics : Harinarayanan BK

5. Gotta go (Addl. Eng-Hin Track)

Singers : Rahul B Seth, Simran Sehgal

Lyrics : Rahul B Seth

6. Poomkathirukal (Reprise version)

Singers : Aysha Farheen, Sreekanth Sasikanth, Sreerag Ram, Simran Sehgal

Lyrics : Thampu Delsy Ninan

References

2016 films
2010s Malayalam-language films